Archie Weller (born 13 July 1957) is an Australian writer of novels, short stories and screen plays.

Early life
Archie Weller was born in Subiaco, Western Australia, and grew up on a farm, Wonnenup, near Cranbrook in the Great Southern region of the state. He attended Guildford Grammar School in Perth as a boarder. His mother was a journalist and his father was a farmer.  As a young child Weller was encouraged by his grandfather to write.

Writing
Weller states he wrote his first book, The Day of the Dog, "within a period of six weeks in a spirit of anger after his release from Broome jail for what he regarded as a wrongful conviction". It won the 1980 The Australian/Vogel Literary Award, in 1982 the inaugural Prose Fiction award in the Western Australia Week Literary Awards, now called the Western Australian Premier's Book Awards, and was made into a film entitled Blackfellas, which won two AFI Awards in 1993. Weller's second novel Land of the Golden Clouds was published in 1998.

Plot of Going Home
The title story in the collection Going Home deals with the complexities of the Aboriginal identity in Australia. It is set in the 1980s and the protagonist has succeeded at university. He excels at sports, studies art and does paintings that are admired by the white community. But in achieving this acceptance he has turned his back on his home and his family. He feels white, but at the same time he is proud to be black. On his 21st birthday, nostalgia for his roots leads him to return to the camp of his birth, only to discover that his new "white" identity is invisible in the darkness of ignorance and prejudice. In contrast, another story in the collection, "Herbie", is about a white boy named Davey who witnesses the killing of an Aboriginal boy and though he is cruel to the boy and offers no resistance to the boys who eventually result in his death, the boy sympathises with Herbie's mother and shows remorse. In this story he portrays a boy who at the time has no empathy towards Herbie, an indigenous boy.  It portrays bullying and brutal behaviour in a schoolyard with fatal consequences.

Confession of a Headhunter
The script Confessions of a Headhunter, which Weller co-wrote with Sally Riley, won an award in the 2001 Western Australian Premier's Book Awards, the Cinema Nova Award and the 2000 Australian Film Institute Awards for Best Short Fiction Film, and the 2001 Film Critics Circle of Australia award for Best Short Film.

Bibliography

Novels
 Day of the Dog (Allen & Unwin, 1981)
 Land of the Golden Clouds (Allen & Unwin, 1998)

Poetry
 The Unknown Soldier and other poems (Access Press, 2007)

Short stories
 Going Home: Stories (Allen & Unwin, 1986)Review
 Pension Day
 Dead Dingo
 Johnny Blue
 Stolen Car
 Sandcastles
 Herbie
 Fish and Chips
 The Window Seat (University of Queensland Press, 2009)

Drama and screenplays
 Nidjera: Children Crying Softly Together: A Play Exploring The Emotions of a Modern Day Koori Family (1990)
 Saturday Night, Sunday Morning, with Rima Tamou (1999)
 Confessions of a Headhunter, with Sally Riley (2000)

Edited
 Us Fellas: An Anthology of Aboriginal Writing, with Colleen Glass (Perth: Artlook, 1987)

References

 
 
 

1957 births
Living people
Australian dramatists and playwrights
Australian male novelists
Australian screenwriters
Australian male short story writers
Indigenous Australian writers
Noongar people
Writers from Perth, Western Australia
People educated at Guildford Grammar School